Samjhauta (English: Compromise) is a 1973 Bollywood drama film directed by Ajay Biswas and produced by Sandeep Sethi. It stars Anil Dhawan, Yogeeta Bali, Shatrughan Sinha, Pradeep Kumar, Naaz, Sulochana Latkar in pivotal roles. The music was composed by Kalyanji-Anandji.

Cast
Anil Dhawan as Gopal
Yogeeta Bali as Shanno
Shatrughan Sinha as Shankar
Pradeep Kumar as Bhola
Naaz as Champa
Sulochana Latkar as Gopal & Champa's Mother

Soundtrack
All songs were composed by Kalyanji Anandji. Indeevar and Verma Malik wrote the lyrics.

The song "Samjautha Ghamon Se Kar Lo" was made in two versions, male and female, sung by Kishore Kumar and Lata Mangeshkar.

"Badi Dur Se Aaye Hain, Pyaar Kaa Tohafaa Laaye Hain" - Mohammed Rafi, Mukesh
"Samajhautaa Gamon Se Kar Lo" - Kishore Kumar
"Sabake Rahate Lagataa Hai Aise Koi NahinHai Meraa" - Mohammed Rafi
"Samjhauta Ghamo Se Karlo (Female)" - Lata Mangeshkar
"Na Roop Dekhiye Na Naam Dekhiye" - Kishore Kumar
"Jo Dilo Ke Naate Hai" - Mohammed Rafi
"Tanak Tuk Tanda" - Kishore Kumar (written by Verma Malik)
"Are Sun Bhaiya Sun" - Mohammed Rafi

References

External links

1973 films
Films scored by Kalyanji Anandji
1970s Hindi-language films
Indian drama films